Archbishop Elpidophoros of America (born Ioannis Lambriniadis; 28 November 1967) is a bishop of the Ecumenical Patriarchate of Constantinople. On 22 June 2019 he became the Archbishop of the Greek Orthodox Archdiocese of America. The official title of Archbishop Elpidophoros: His Eminence Archbishop Elpidophoros (Lambriniadis) of America, Most Honorable Exarch of the Greek Orthodox Archdiocese of America. He is the eighth Archbishop of America elected since the establishment of the Greek Orthodox Archdiocese in 1922.

Biography

Ioannis Lambriniadis was born and raised in Istanbul′s Bakırköy district (Makrohori), Turkey. He attended the Urban School of Makrochori in Istanbul before attending high school in Athens and then the School of Pastoral and Social Theology at the Aristotle University of Thessaloniki in 1987–1988.  While living in Turkey he also served in the Turkish Military.

Later, he studied at the Department of Pastoral Theology, Theological School of the Aristotle University of Thessaloniki, from which he graduated (BA) in 1991. In 1993, he finished his postgraduate studies at the Philosophical School of the University of Bonn, Germany. 

In 1994, he was ordained deacon at the Patriarchal Cathedral in Istanbul and was appointed as the Codecographer of the Holy and Sacred Synod.

"In 1995, he was appointed Deputy Secretary of the Holy Synod of the Ecumenical Patriarchate." In 1996–1997, he studied Arabic Language at the Theological School of St. John the Damascene in Balamand, Lebanon.

In 2004, he was invited to Holy Cross Greek Orthodox School of Theology in Brookline, MA, where he taught as a visiting professor for one semester. 

In March 2005, at the proposal of the Ecumenical Patriarch Bartholomew, he was appointed to the position of Chief Secretary and was ordained to the priesthood by the Ecumenical Patriarch. 

He was installed as the Metropolitan of Bursa on 20 March 2011. In August of the same year, he was appointed Abbot of the Monastery of the Holy Trinity on Heybeliada.

Since 2011, Elpidophoros has undertaken the duties of associate professor at Aristotle University's Department of Pastoral and Social Theology, teaching Symbolics, Interorthodox – InterChristian Relations and Ecumenical Movement. 

On 11 May 2019, he was elected by the Holy Synod of the Ecumenical Patriarchate as next Archbishop of America to succeed Archbishop Demetrios. He was enthroned on 22 June 2019.

Archbishop Elpidophoros had a meeting with U.S. President Donald Trump and other White House officials on 16 July 2019.

In July 2022, he performed in Athens the first Greek Orthodox baptism of babies adopted by a homosexual couple; namely, he baptized two babies adopted by clothing designers Evanggelos Bousis and Peter Dundas. According to the Metropolitan where this baptism took place, Elpidophoros misled the Metropolitan and this was reported to the Synod of the Church of Greece.

Marching in Brooklyn 
On 3 June 2020, at the invitation of the Borough President of Brooklyn, Eric Leroy Adams, and State Senator Andrew Gounardes, Archbishop Elpidophoros attended a peaceful protest in Crown Heights, Brooklyn over the killing of Louisville EMT Breonna Taylor. In remarks following the march he said:

"I came here to Brooklyn today in order to stand in solidarity with my fellow sisters and brothers whose rights have been sorely abused. This was a peaceful protest, one without violence of any kind, and I thank all of those involved, because violence begets only more violence. We must speak and speak loudly against the injustice in our country. It is our moral duty and obligation to uphold the sanctity of every human being. We have faced a pandemic of grave physical illness, but the spiritual illness in our land runs even deeper and must be healed by actions as well as words. And so, I will continue to stand in the breach together with all those who are committed to preserving peace, justice, and equality for every citizen of goodwill, regardless of their race, religion, gender or ethnic origin."

Hagia Sophia 
In early July 2020, the Council of State annulled the Cabinet's 1934 decision to establish the museum, revoking the monument's status, and a subsequent decree by Turkish president Recep Tayyip Erdoğan ordered the reclassification of Hagia Sophia as a mosque. Archbishop Elpidophoros took a stand against this decision. On 19 July, the Members of the Holy Eparchial Synod of the Greek Orthodox Archdiocese of America, under the presidency of Archbishop Elpidophoros, designated 24 July as a day of mourning.  In an interview with the BBC, the archbishop said, "This day is for us a mourning day. It’s the day we grieve this decision of the Turkish government to reconvert a monument, which is so important for the whole world. This is such a painful situation for us that we announced this day as a day for mourning. It’s like Good Friday for all Christians." He went on to say, "Certainly I can tell you that we will never stop. It’s a beginning for us. We will start a campaign. I already, yesterday, had the opportunity to express the concerns of all Orthodox Christians in the United States to the President, Trump, who received me in the White House, and to the Vice President, Mr. Pence." 

On 23 July 2020, Archbishop Elpidophoros met with President Donald Trump and Vice President Mike Pence on the concerns of the Ecumenical Patriarchate and the Greek Orthodox Archdiocese over the seizure and re-conversion of the Hagia Sophia into a mosque. Following the meeting with the President and Vice President, the Archbishop stated: "I am grateful to have met with President Trump and Vice President Pence in the White House and communicated our grave dismay at the re-conversion of Hagia Sophia into a mosque, as well as ongoing security concerns for the Ecumenical Patriarchate and issues of religious liberty. In view of tomorrow’s day of mourning, we persevere in prayer but also bring our struggle to the highest levels of government for action and consideration." While the archbishop was meeting with the president, the US House of Representatives passed, by unanimous consent, an amendment offered by Congresswoman Dina Titus (D-NV) objecting to Turkey's seizure of the Great Church of Holy Wisdom.

The Titus amendment to HR 7608 - which was cosponsored by Congressmen Gus Bilirakis (R-FL), John Sarbanes (D-MD), Chris Pappas (D-NH), David Cicilline (D-RI), Ted Deutch (D-FL), Brad Sherman (D-CA) and Brad Schneider (D-IL) - calls on the State Department to "denounce Turkey for taking formal action to change the status of Hagia Sophia, a UNESCO World Heritage Site spiritually significant to people of many faiths and backgrounds, from a museum to a mosque; and to engage with Turkey for the purpose of returning its status to a museum so as to welcome people of all faiths and those who have marveled at its architectural and artistic splendor."

References

1967 births
Living people
Eastern Orthodox Christians from Turkey
21st-century Eastern Orthodox archbishops
Archbishops of the Greek Orthodox Archdiocese of America
Constantinopolitan Greeks
Turkish people of Greek descent
Aristotle University of Thessaloniki alumni
University of Balamand alumni
University of Bonn alumni
Greek academics
Recipients of the Order of Prince Yaroslav the Wise, 4th class
People from Bakırköy
Clergy from Istanbul
